Ingolf Rogde (14 May 1911 – 4 June 1978) was a Norwegian actor. He was born in Sande, Møre og Romsdal, and was married to actress Siri Rom. He was mainly known for his long-term period with the touring theatre Riksteatret. Rogde made his stage debut at Trøndelag Teater in 1937, and was later assigned with Det Nye Teater, Det Norske Teatret, Riksteatret and Rogaland Teater. He also worked for Radioteatret. Among his films are Rikard Nordraak (1945) and Ugler i mosen (1959). He was decorated Knight, First Class of the Order of St. Olav in 1969.

References

External links

1911 births
1978 deaths
People from Sande, Møre og Romsdal
Norwegian male stage actors
Norwegian male film actors
20th-century Norwegian male actors